Lyès Salem (Arabic: إلياس سالم) (Algiers, 1966) is an Algerian actor and film director.

His first film as director, Masquerades, won several prizes in France.

Filmography

As director
 Lhasa short 1999
 :fr:Cousines short. Awards at Festival de Clermont-Ferrand and César Awards.
 Jean-Farès short. Awards Festival international du film de Marrakech 2001
 Mascarades first feature film

As actor

 L’Ecole de la Chair (1998)
 American Cuisine (1998) - Karim
 Rendezvous in Samarkand (1999) - Mohammed
 Meet the Baltringues (2000)
 Filles uniques (2003) - L'avocat jeune beur
 À ton image (2004) - Antoine
 Banlieue 13 (2004) - Samy
 Alex (2005) - Karim
 Munich (2005) - Arab Guard #1
 Délice Paloma (2007) - Maître Djaffar
 The First Day of the Rest of Your Life (2008) - Le type saoul qui veut du Abba
 Mascarades (2008) - Mounir Mekbel
 La tête en friche (2010) - Youssef - le serveur
 Des filles en noir (2010) - Le docteur
 Dernier étage gauche gauche (2010) - Hamza Barriba
 Nobody Else But You (2011) - Gus
 Rock the Casbah (2013) - Youssef
 L'Oranais (2014) - Djaffar
 I'm Dead But I Have Friends (2015) - Dany
 Je suis à vous tout de suite (2015) - Le douanier algérien
 Carole Matthieu (2016) - Alain
 Ôtez-moi d'un doute (2017) - Madjid
 Sparring (2017) - Omar
 Ramdam (2017) - Amine
 La finale (2018) - Hicham Soualem
 Le mystère Henri Pick (2019) - Producteur émission Infinitif
 Abou Leila (2019)

References

1973 births
Algerian male film actors
Algerian film directors
Living people
21st-century Algerian male actors
French National Academy of Dramatic Arts alumni